A religious community is a community (group of people) who practice the same religion. The term is used to refer to members of a religion who live within a community, but not segregated from others and not dedicated solely to their faith. They worship together in a religious venue such as a temple, synagogue, church or mosque. In many religions, a group worshipping in common is called a congregation. In a narrower sense, a religious community is a group of people of the same religion living together specifically for religious purposes, often subject to formal commitments such as religious vows, as in a convent or a monastery. Most religious communities are part of the way religions are organized, and most religions have some form of Religious order.

Christianity

Christianity has had a variety of religious groups dating back to the early church. Christian monasticism began in the Eastern churches, and eventually moved to the west.

Catholicism
Religious Order In the Catholic Church, a religious order is a community of consecrated life that is also an Institute. Their members that take solemn vows. In the church, they are a type of religious institute. Under the broad category of religious order are canons regular and monasteries, mendicants and clerics regular. 

Religious Congregation A Congregation is a type of department of the Roman Curia, ranking below the two Secretariats, and above the pontifical councils, pontifical commissions, tribunals and offices.
Monasteries and convents In the Western church, the concept of monasticism was patterned after the Eastern church. Monasteries and convents became an important part of European life.

Parish A parish is a religious community within a particular church, led by a parish priest, under the authority of the diocesan bishop. It is the lowest ecclesiastical subdivision in the Catholic episcopal polity, and the primary constituent unit of a diocese or eparchy. In the 1983 Code of Canon Law, parishes are constituted under cc. 515–552, entitled "Parishes, Pastors, and Parochial Vicars."

Eastern Orthodoxy

Christian monasticism began in the Eastern Mediterranean in Syria, Palestine and Egypt. In the Eastern Orthodox Church, Oriental Orthodoxy, the Church of the East and Eastern Catholicism, monastic communities of monks and nuns followed the Rule of St Basil.

Intentional communities

While not Christian in nature, an intentional community is a voluntary residential community designed to have a high degree of social cohesion. There are many secular communities, but monasteries, kibbutzim and ashrams are the religious versions. 

Lay religious communities are Christian examples of intentional communities. They include groups such as the Hutterites, Anabaptist Bruderhof Communities, Amish and some Mennonite churches, and the Shaker communities.

Buddhist monasteries

In Buddhism, the Buddhist monastery (Vihāra) is a place for Buddhist monks and nuns (bhikkhu). In early Sanskrit and Pali texts, Vihāra meant any arrangement of dwellings for the bhikkhu. Over time, the concept evolved into an architectural style for living quarters for monks with an open shared space or courtyard.

Hinduism
An ashram is a spiritual hermitage or a monastery in Indian religions. Traditionally, an ashram would be located far from human habitation, among natural surroundings conducive to spiritual instruction and meditation.

Islam

The Quran typically refers to the ummah as a single group that shares common religious beliefs, specifically those that are the objects of a divine plan of salvation.

See also
 Full communion in Christianity
 Religious congregation
 Religious organization
 Ghetto

References

Further reading

External links

Types of communities
Community
Sociology of religion